The 2006 Uzbek League season was the 15th edition of top level football in Uzbekistan since independence from the Soviet Union in 1992.

League table

Season statistics

Top goalscorers

Last updated: 12 November 2006

References
Uzbekistan - List of final tables (RSSSF)

Uzbekistan Super League seasons
1
Uzbek
Uzbek